The 2012–13 Biathlon World Cup – Sprint Men will start at Saturday December 1, 2012 in Östersund and will finish Thursday March 14, 2013 in Khanty-Mansiysk. Defending titlist is Martin Fourcade of France.

Competition format
The 10 kilometres (6,23 mi) sprint race is the third oldest biathlon event; the distance is skied over three laps. The biathlete shoots two times at any shooting lane, first prone, then standing, totalling 10 targets. For each missed target the biathlete has to complete a penalty lap of around 150 metres. Competitors' starts are staggered, normally by 30 seconds.

2011-12 Top 3 Standings

Medal winners

Standings

References

- Sprint Men, 2012-13 Biathlon World Cup